James Otis Cochran (ca. 1767 – April 7, 1813) was a Congressional Representative from North Carolina; born near Mount Tirzah Township, Person County, North Carolina, about 1767; attended the public schools; engaged in agricultural pursuits near Helena, North Carolina; member of the State house of commons 1802–1806; served in the State senate in 1807; elected as a Republican to the Eleventh and Twelfth Congresses (March 4, 1809 – March 3, 1813); died in Roxboro, Person County, N.C., April 7, 1813; interment in the burial ground at Leas Chapel, five miles west of Roxboro, N.C.  He is the grandfather of James Cochran Dobbin.

Cochran parents, Charles and Isabelle (Whitelaw) Cochran, were natives of Perth, Scotland.

External links

Members of the North Carolina House of Representatives
North Carolina state senators
American people of Scottish descent
1813 deaths
1760s births
Democratic-Republican Party members of the United States House of Representatives from North Carolina
People from Person County, North Carolina